The men's normal hill individual ski jumping competition for the 2018 Winter Olympics in Pyeongchang, South Korea, was held on 8 to 10 February 2018 at the Alpensia Ski Jumping Stadium.

Summary
The field included the 2014 champion and the 2017–18 FIS Ski Jumping World Cup leader Kamil Stoch, the 2014 silver medalist Peter Prevc, the 2016–17 FIS Ski Jumping World Cup overall winner Stefan Kraft, as well as the 2010 champion Simon Ammann. After the first jump, Stefan Hula Jr. was leading, with almost six points ahead of Stoch and Johann André Forfang shared second. In the second jump, both Hula and Stoch underperformed, and Andreas Wellinger, who was in the fifth position, became the Olympic champion after receiving 134.4 points for his jump, the highest scored jump of the competition. Forfang remained second, and Robert Johansson came from the tenth place to turn the bronze medalist.

In the victory ceremony, the medals were presented by Irena Szewińska, member of the International Olympic Committee, accompanied by Alfons Hoermann, FIS council member.

Results

Qualifying
50 ski jumpers qualified for the finals.

Final
The final was held on 10 February at 21:35.

References

Ski jumping at the 2018 Winter Olympics
Men's events at the 2018 Winter Olympics